Mount Vernon High School (MVHS) is a public high school in the Chester Heights section of the City of Mount Vernon in Westchester County, New York, United States. It is part of the Mount Vernon City School District. The current Mount Vernon High School came into existence from the merger of the former A.B. Davis High School and Edison Tech in 1964.

Sports 
The school colors are maroon and gold, and teams are nicknamed the Knights. Sports include cheerleading, volleyball, track & field, baseball, softball, basketball, swimming, gymnastics, and football.

Basketball
New York state high school boys basketball championships titles: 1991, 2000, 2004, 2006, 2011

Notable basketball players
 Isaiah Cousins (born 1994) - now the Israeli Basketball Premier League, formerly the University of Oklahoma, Sacramento Kings
 Richie Garner - Manhattan College, drafted by New York Knicks (later assistant principal at the high school)
 Ben Gordon - University of Connecticut, Chicago Bulls, Detroit Pistons, Charlotte Bobcats
 Rudy Hackett  - Syracuse University, Spirits of St. Louis, New York Nets, Indiana Pacers
 Kevin Jones - West Virginia University, Cleveland Cavaliers
 Chris Lowe - University of Massachusetts 
 Rodney McCray - University of Louisville, Houston Rockets, 1992-93 NBA champion Chicago Bulls, NCAA champion
 Scooter McCray - University of Louisville, Cleveland Cavaliers, and Seattle SuperSonics
 Lowes Moore - West Virginia University, New Jersey Nets, Cleveland Cavaliers
 Earl Tatum - Marquette University, Los Angeles Lakers
 Gus Williams – University of Southern California, Seattle SuperSonics (1979 NBA Champions)
 Ray Williams - University of Minnesota, New York Knicks

Other notable alumni
Rai Benjamin, olympic hurdler 
Ralph Branca (1926–2016), Major League Baseball pitcher
 Art Carney, actor
 Dick Clark, television personality
 Heavy D, rapper and actor
Janet DiFiore, Chief Judge of New York State Court of Appeals
George Latimer, Westchester County Executive
 Arthur Naparstek, social worker and academic 
 Pete Rock, rapper, DJ and producer
 Ken Singleton, Major League Baseball player
 C.L. Smooth, rapper 
 JB Smoove, actor, comedian, writer
 Al B. Sure!, singer
 Denzel Washington, actor
 Carol Wax, print maker
 E. B. White, writer

Notable faculty 

 Henry Littlefield, historian known for his political interpretation of The Wonderful Wizard of Oz

References

"Mount Vernon NY has a Unique Connection to the NBA",lohud.com/Journal News
Ronald Lee Fleming,4th Street Playground:The Mecca at Google Books

External links 
 Mount Vernon School District
 Mount Vernon Basketball

Public high schools in Westchester County, New York
Mount Vernon, New York
1894 establishments in New York (state)